Karl Philipp, Fürst zu Schwarzenberg (or Charles Philip, Prince of Schwarzenberg; 18/19 April 1771 – 15 October 1820) was an Austrian Generalissimo. He fought in the Battle of Wagram (1809) but the Austrians lost decisively against Napoleon. He had to fight for Napoleon in the Battle of Gorodechno (1812) against the Russians and won. He was in command of the allied army that defeated Napoleon decisively in the Battle of Leipzig (1813).
He joined the Battle of Paris (1814) that forced Napoleon to abdicate.

Family
Karl Philipp was born 18/19 April 1771 in Vienna, the son of Johann Nepomuk Anton of Schwarzenberg and Marie Eleonore Countess of Öttingen-Wallerstein. He was one of thirteen siblings, seven of whom did not reach adulthood.

Imperial service

Karl Philipp entered the imperial cavalry in 1788, fought in 1789 under Lacy and Laudon against the Turks, distinguished himself by his bravery, and became a major in 1792. In the French campaign of 1793 he served in the advanced guard of the army commanded by Prince Josias of Coburg, and at Le Cateau-Cambrésis in 1794 his impetuous charge at the head of his regiment, vigorously supported by twelve British squadrons, broke a whole corps of the French (of around 25,000 men), killed and wounded 3,000 men, and captured 32 of the enemy's guns. He was immediately decorated with the Knight's Cross of the Military Order of Maria Theresa.

After taking part in the battles of Amberg and Würzburg in 1796 during the French Revolutionary Wars, he was raised to the rank of general-major, and, in 1799, he subsequently was promoted to Generalleutnant. At the Battle of Hohenlinden (3 December 1800) he led a division in the right wing. During the retreat, his promptitude and courage saved the right wing of the Austrian army from destruction, and the Archduke Charles of Austria afterwards entrusted him with the command of the rearguard. In 1804 Prince Karl Philipp was created Fürst zu Schwarzenberg in a title identical to, but separate from, that of his brother, .

In the  war of 1805 he held command of a division under Mack, and when Napoleon surrounded Ulm in October, Schwarzenberg was one of the band of cavalry, under the Archduke Ferdinand of Austria-Este, which cut its way through the hostile lines. In the same year he received the Commander's Cross of the Order of Maria Theresa and in 1809 he was awarded the Order of the Golden Fleece.

He took part in the Battle of Wagram (July 1809), leading a cavalry division in the Reserve Corps and was soon afterwards promoted to general of cavalry. 

Napoleon held Schwarzenberg in great esteem, and at his request the prince took command of the Austrian auxiliary corps with a new rank as Field Marshal in the Russian campaign of 1812. The Austrian field marshal won some minor victories against the Russians at Gorodetschna and  Wolkowisk. Napoleon said in his memoirs, that Schwarzenberg instead of supporting Minsk retreated to Warsaw and abandoned the French army thus allowing  to seize Minsk. Afterwards, under instructions from Napoleon, he remained for some months inactive at Pultusk.

In 1813, when Austria, after many hesitations, took the side of  the allies against Napoleon, Schwarzenberg, recently promoted to Generalissimo, was appointed commander-in-chief of the allied Grand Army of Bohemia. As such, he was the senior of the allied generals who conducted the  campaign of 1813–1814. Under his command, the allied army was mauled by Napoleon at the Battle of Dresden on 26–27 August and driven back into Bohemia. However, his army defeated pursuing French forces at the Second Battle of Kulm (17 September 1813). Returning to the fray, he led the Allied army north again and played a major role in Napoleon's decisive defeat at the Battle of Leipzig on 16–18 October. During the invasion of France in 1814 he attacked through Switzerland and beat a French force at the Battle of Bar-sur-Aube on 27 February 1814. He repelled an attack by Napoleon in the Battle of Arcis-sur-Aube on 20–21 March and overcame the last barrier before Paris by winning the Battle of Fère-Champenoise on 25 March. His capture of the French capital on 31 March after the  Battle of Paris resulted in the overthrow of Napoleon.

The next year, during the Hundred Days when Napoleon escaped from Elba and regained the French throne, in the  hostilities that followed Schwarzenberg commanded the Army of the Upper Rhine (an Austrian-allied army of about a quarter of a million men). But shortly afterwards, having lost his sister Caroline, to whom he was deeply attached, he fell ill. A stroke disabled him in 1817, and in 1820, when revisiting Leipzig, the scene of the  "Battle of the Nations" that he had directed seven years before, he suffered a second stroke. He died there on 15 October.

Personality
In 1806–1809 Schwarzenberg served as the Austrian ambassador to  Russia. 

After the signing of Treaty of Schönbrunn (14 October 1809), he was sent to Paris as ambassador to negotiate the 1810 marriage between  Napoleon and the Archduchess Marie Louise of Austria. The prince gave a ball in honour of the bride on 1 July 1810, which ended in a fire that killed many of the guests, including his own sister-in-law, wife of his older brother, Joseph.

In 1812, Schwarzenberg signed the Treaty of Paris, making Austria an ally of France. The Austrians were forced by Napoleon to send Schwarzenberg to command a corps to the Grande Armée. He had to show enough commitment to please Napoleon without angering Russia. In the end he just failed to protect the Grande Armé from a flank attack at the Berezina. But in late November his soldiers withdrew into winter quarters at Byalistok under a verbal agreement with the Russians. 7,000 of his soldiers were killed in battle and 4,000 died of disease and exposure of some 30,000 who had entered Russia, in a disastrous campaign where Napoleon lost 500.000 of 600.000 men.

He won against Napoleon although the three monarchs of the Coalition powers were present at the Battle of Leipzig (1813), with Emperor Alexander I of Russia at the head of the three alongside King Frederick William III of Prussia and Emperor Francis I of Austria, and a substantial staff supported the Coalition commanders. Alexander was also the supreme commander of the Coalition forces in the eastern front of the war, while Prince Karl von Schwarzenberg of Austria was the commander-in-chief of all Coalition forces in the German theatre.

Marriage and descendants

The Prince married the Countess Maria Anna von Hohenfeld (20 May 1767–1848), who was the widow of Prince Anton Esterhazy von Galantha. They had three sons:

 Friedrich, Prince of Schwarzenberg (1800–70), his eldest son, had an adventurous career as a soldier, and described his wanderings and campaigns in several interesting works, of which the best known is his Wanderungen eines Lanzknechtes (1844–1845). He took part as an Austrian officer in the campaigns of Galicia 1846, Italy 1848 and Hungary 1848, and as an amateur in the French conquest of Algeria, the Carlist Wars in Spain and the Swiss civil war of the Sonderbund. He became a major-general in the Austrian army in 1849, and died after many years of well-filled leisure in 1870. 
 Karl II Borromäus Philipp (1802–1858), the second son, was a Feldzeugmeister, and Governor of Transylvania (1851-1858). 
 Edmund Leopold Friedrich (1803–73), his third son, was a Field marshal in the Austrian army. 
Of Schwarzenberg's nephews, Felix Schwarzenberg, the statesman, was also notable, and Friedrich Johann Josef Coelestin (1809–1885) was a cardinal and a prominent figure in papal and Austrian history.

Honours

Gallery

Ancestry

Notes

References

 
 
 
 
 
 
 

Attribution:
 Endnotes:
Anton von Prokesch-Osten: Denkwürdigkeiten aus dem Leben des Feldmarschalls Fürsten Carl zu Schwarzenberg. Vienna, 1823
Adolph Berger: Das Fürstenhaus Schwarzenberg. Vienna, 1866
and a memoir by Adolph Berger in Streffleur's Österreichische Militärische Zeitschrift Jhg. 1863.

1771 births
1820 deaths
Field marshals of Austria
Karl Philipp
Nobility from Vienna
Princes of Schwarzenberg
Military personnel from Vienna
Austrian generals
Austrian soldiers
Military leaders of the French Revolutionary Wars
Austrian Empire military leaders of the French Revolutionary Wars
Austrian Empire commanders of the Napoleonic Wars
Knights of the Golden Fleece of Austria
Grand Crosses of the Order of Saint Stephen of Hungary
Grand Crosses of the Military Order of Maria Theresa
Recipients of the Order of St. George of the First Degree
Grand Crosses of the Military Order of Max Joseph
Knights Grand Cross of the Order of the Sword
Honorary Knights Grand Cross of the Order of the Bath
Knights Grand Cross of the Military Order of William